Masaji Tabata (December 1, 1898 – August 25, 1984) was a Japanese educator, journalist, and swimming coach. He was a key figure in Tokyo's successful bid to host the 1964 Summer Olympics. He served as the president of the Japanese Olympic Committee from 1973 to 1977.

As a journalist 
Tabata was born in Hamamatsu, Shizuoka Prefecture, to a family of sake brewery managers. He started working for the Asahi Shimbun after graduating from the University of Tokyo and covered political issues, including the 1936 attempted military coup.

Involvement in sports 
Tabata devoted his life to swimming. At the 1932 Los Angeles Olympics, he served as the head coach of Japan's swimming team,  which won twelve medals, including five golds.

Tabata became the president of Japan Swimming Federation after World War II. Japan was excluded from international sporting events at the time and Tabata worked for his country's early return to world stage. He organized a national swimming championship to coincide with the 1948 London Olympics to show off Japanese swimmers' abilities. Competitors including Hironoshin Furuhashi and Shiro Hashizume finished faster than the gold medalists in London, but their records were not recognized worldwide because Japan was not a member of the International Swimming Federation. Their membership was accepted a year later.

Tabata served as the chef demission for Japan's delegation at the Helsinki Olympics in 1952 when his country's participation was accepted for the first time since the war. He held the same position in Melbourne four years later.

After Tokyo won the bid to host the 1964 Olympics, Tabata was appointed the head of the Games' organizing committee and lobbied for making women's volleyball an Olympic event. He was forced to resign before the Games due to a dispute over Japan's participation in the 1962 Asian Games. Indonesia, which hosted the event, refused to issue visas for athletes from Israel and Taiwan, and became at odds with the International Olympic Committee.

After the Tokyo Olympics, Tabata took part in the foundation of Tokyo Swimming Center, which later produced Olympic medalists including Kosuke Kitajima, Reiko Nakamura, and Haruka Ueda.

Tabata was involved in Japan's successful bid to host the 1972 Winter Olympics and became JOC president in 1973.

Tabata died in 1984. He was 85.

See also
Idaten

References

立教大学体育会水泳部の歴史-3
古橋広之進 - 国際留学生協会
 【オリンピズム】五輪旗と組織委員会（4）スポーツ界自立に人生捧ぐ - 産経ニュース 2013.10.29
紛糾したアジア競技大会とGANEFO。そしてインドネシアと北朝鮮の引き揚げ - 日本オリンピック委員会（コラム「東京オリンピック開催へ」 Vol.3）

1898 births
1984 deaths
Members of the Japanese Olympic Committee
University of Tokyo alumni
Presidents of the Japan Swimming Federation